The Whitegate refinery, near Whitegate, County Cork, is Ireland's only oil refinery. It has a capacity of 75,000 barrels of oil per day (bpd), sufficient to provide 40 percent of Ireland's fuel requirements. It was commissioned in 1959 and was redeveloped several times and produces a range of petroleum products.

History 
In the late 1950s, the Government of Ireland wished to develop industry in the country. A consortium of oil companies formed the Irish Refining Company Limited to construct and operate a refinery; the participant companies and their interests were Esso (40%), Shell-Mex & BP (40%) and Caltex (20%). The refinery was constructed on a 330-acre (133 ha) site at Whitegate, East Cork, County Cork. It was built over the period 1957 to 1959 at a cost of about £12.5 million. The refinery was commissioned in April 1959 with Esso as the operator. In 1965 the refinery was expanded to increase the capacity from 1.9 million tons per year to 2.5 million tons per year. The cost of the upgrade was £3 million. 

In 1981, the Irish Refining Company Limited closed the refinery because of poor financial returns. The government recognised that permanent closure would have major economic and strategic consequences. Ownership was transferred to the Irish state in March 1982 through the Irish National Petroleum Corporation. The refinery was purchased by Tosco in July 2001, and Tosco were then taken over by Phillips Petroleum in September 2001. Phillips merged with Conoco in September 2002 to form ConocoPhillips. In 2012, Phillips 66 assumed ownership. Irving Oil purchased the refinery in 2016 and are the owner .

Plant and processes 

Whitegate is a relatively simple refinery with a Nelson complexity index of 3.8. Crude oil arrives at the refinery by tanker at the Marine Terminal. This comprises two berths, Berth 1 for tankers of up to 160,000 tonnes and Berth 2 for coasters of up to 5,000 tonnes. Oil from the tankers is routed to one of seven floating roof crude oil tanks on Corkbeg Island where it is stored until required at the refinery. There are also ballast water facilities

The operation of the refinery process plant is summarised in the following table.

The products from the refinery are stored in the adjacent tank farm until required. Petroleum blendstocks are also imported via the Marine Terminal and are routed to the blending plant. High flash point products such as crude oil, gasolines, blendstocks, and naphtha are stored in floating roof tanks. Low flash point substances such as kerosene, gasoil, diesel and heavy fuel oil are stored in cone roof tanks. Propane and butane are stored at pressure in spherical vessels.

Utilities 
A number of utilities support the refinery operations:

 Ballast water treatment and disposal
 Drains – including API separator
 Demineralisation plant – for boiler feedwater
 Electricity – 6.2 MW gas turbine combined heat and power plant (CHP). There are two 110 kV feeder lines from the National Grid via the adjacent Whitegate substation. Electricity can also be fed from the refinery into the National Grid. 
 Steam – 13.5 tonnes per hour
 Air – plant and instrument air
 Process cooling – air coolers

Production

Crude oil supply 
The supply of crude oil as the refinery's main feedstock from 1990 to 2019 is shown on the graph. Figures are in thousand tonnes of oil equivalent.

Products 
The products from the refinery are:

 Propane
 Butane
 Gasoline
 Kerosene
 Diesel
 Heating Oil
 Heavy fuel oil
 Sulphuric acid

The production of each of the products in 2010 was:

The total production (in 1,000 barrels) from the refinery over the period 1994 to 2010 was:

Export 
The majority of products are exported by sea via the Marine Terminal. LPG is transferred to the adjacent Calor gas bottling plant by pipeline. The road loading facility has five bottom loading bays for exporting gasoline, gas oil and kerosene to local consumers.

The refinery was run at a loss of $22.5 million in 2020, as a result of reduced demand because of Covid. This compares to a profit of $84.7 million in 2019.

Whitegate power station 
Adjacent to the refinery to the south (Coordinates: 51°49’07”N 08°15’17”W) is the Whitegate power station, Glanagow, County Cork. This 435 MW gas turbine station is owned by Bord Gáis part of Centrica. It is designed to run on natural gas or distillate oil, the latter from the refinery, and operates as a combined cycle gas turbine (CCGT).

See also 

 Oil terminals in Ireland
 Energy in Ireland
 Whitegate power station

References 

Oil refineries
Petroleum in Ireland
Energy in Ireland
Energy infrastructure in the Republic of Ireland
Energy infrastructure in Ireland
Fossil fuels in the Republic of Ireland